Carex erythrobasis, the red-based leaf sedge, is a species of flowering plant in the family Cyperaceae, native to Manchuria, Korea, and Primorsky Krai in Russia. It is found in the understory of both broadleaf and Korean pine forests.

References

erythrobasis
Flora of Manchuria
Flora of Korea
Flora of Primorsky Krai
Plants described in 1908